John MacLeod (born 14 May 1948 in Fearn, Scotland – died 17 December 2020 in Portmahomack, Scotland), known in Scottish Gaelic as Iain MacLeòid, was educated at the University of Aberdeen and the Free Church College, Edinburgh, and was a minister of the Free Church of Scotland (Continuing) who served in congregations of the Free Church of Scotland and Free Church of Scotland (Continuing) in Scotland and North America. He came to prominence in connection with allegations against Donald Macleod, Professor of Systematic Theology at the Free Church College: the professor was answerable to the Training of the Ministry Committee, of which Rev. MacLeod was clerk. This led, in January 2000, to an attempt to suspend him and over twenty other ministers from the functions of the ministry and to their formation of the "Free Church of Scotland Continuing", of which MacLeod was subsequently appointed the Principal Clerk of Assembly.  He was moderator of the 2006 FCC General Assembly.

Macleod died suddenly on 17 December 2020 at the age of 72.

Footnotes

References 
 Who's Who in Scotland (Carrick)

External links
Website of the Free Church Continuing

1948 births
Living people
Alumni of the University of Aberdeen
20th-century Ministers of the Free Church of Scotland